Adebayo Adedeji (21 December 1930 – 25 April 2018) was a Nigerian economist and academic. A full-fledged Professor at the age of 36 years, he was Nigeria's Federal Commissioner for Economic Development & Reconstruction from 1971 to 1975. He was responsible for the economic development and reconstruction of post-civil war Nigeria. In June 1975, he was appointed Executive Secretary of the United Nations Economic Commission for Africa and remained in this position until July 1991. Adedeji wrote the Lagos Plan of Action of 1980 that was adopted by the UN and OAU. On his return to Nigeria, he founded the African Centre for Development and Strategic Studies (ACDESS), a non-governmental independent continental non-profit, think-tank dedicated to multi-disciplinary and strategic studies on and for Africa. He received the national honor of Commander of the Federal Republic.

In December 2010, after turning 80, he retired from public life and spent the last years of his life quietly in his home town of Ijebu-Ode, Ogun State, Nigeria.

Adedeji was elected a Fellow of the African Academy of Sciences in 1991.

Biography 
Adebayo Adedeji was born on 21 December 1930 in Ijebu Ode, Nigeria.

Adedeji died in the evening on 25 April 2018 in Lagos after suffering from a long illness. UNECA held a memorial symposium in his honor on 7 July in Lagos.

References

Weblinks
United Nations Economic Commission for Africa - Remembering Professor Adebayo Adedeji

1930 births
2018 deaths
People from Ijebu Ode
Under-Secretaries-General of the United Nations
Nigerian diplomats
Harvard Kennedy School alumni
Nigerian expatriates in the United States
Academic staff of Obafemi Awolowo University
Alumni of the University of London
Nigerian officials of the United Nations
Nigerian classical liberals
People from Ogun State
Fellows of the African Academy of Sciences